The ERS10 Index is a share index of the 10 companies from the power utility sector which are listed on the Banja Luka Stock Exchange (BLSE), established on 29 December 2005. ERS10 stands for Indeks preduzeća iz sistema Elektroprivrede Republike Srpske, which is Serbian for The Index of the Power Utility Companies of Republika Srpska.

The highest value of the index to 7 September 2006, was on that day, at 2642.95.

Other indices on the Banja Luka Stock Exchange are the BIRS (an index of 12 leading shares) and FIRS (an index of 13 privatisation-investment funds).

All of the companies listed on this index include the abbreviation a.d. (akcionarsko drušvo) at the end of their name, indicating their status of a public limited company.

List of ERS10 companies 
Below is the list of the 10 ERS10 companies on 30 August 2006.
 Elektrodistribucija a.d. Pale
 Elektrokrajina a.d. Banja Luka
 Elektrohercegovina a.d. Trebinje
 Elektro-Bijeljina a.d. Bijeljina
 Elektro Doboj a.d. Doboj
 Hidroelektrane na Drini a.d. Višegrad
 Hidroelektrane na Vrbasu a.d. Mrkonjić Grad
 Hidroelektrane na Trebišnjici a.d. Trebinje
 Rudnik i Termoelektrana Gacko a.d. Gacko
 Rudnik i Termoelektrana Ugljevik a.d. Ugljevik

Performance

See also 
 Republika Srpska Securities Commission

External links
 Banja Luka Stock Exchange

Economy of Bosnia and Herzegovina
Economy of Republika Srpska
Economy of Banja Luka
European stock market indices